The College of Computer Studies (CCS) is one of the eight colleges of De La Salle University. It was established in 1981 as the  Center for Planning, Information, and Computer Science offering only a Bachelor of Science degree in Computer Science. The department was formally declared as a college in 1984. In 1990, the college was transferred to its new building, the INTELLECT (Information Technology Lecture) Building, which was eventually renamed as the Gokongwei Building. In 1996 the college was granted semi-autonomous status along with the Graduate School of Business which led to the establishment of De La Salle-Professional Schools, Inc. The college became a part of De La Salle Professional Schools but later transferred back to the university.

Accreditation
The Bachelor of Science (B.Sc.) Computer Science program of the College was the first Computer Science program in the country to be given accreditation by the Philippine Accrediting Association of Schools, Colleges, and Universities in 1989. It was granted a Level II accreditation in 1993 and was re-accredited to Level II in 1998. In 2000, the College was named as one of the Commission on Higher Education's Center of Development and Excellence in Information Technology. In 2005, the Computer Science program of the college received a Level III accreditation by PAASCU, becoming the first Level III Accredited Computer Science Program in the Philippines . It is the highest accreditation granted in the Philippines to this date for Computer Science programs. In March 2007, the Commission on Higher Education recognized the college as Center of Excellence in Information Technology.

Academic Research Centers

Advanced Research Institute for Informatics, Computing and Networking (AdRIC)
Formerly known as Advanced Research Institute for Computing (AdRIC), the Advanced Research Institute for Informatics, Computing and Networking is the research center of the college. The center aims to produce both local and international research through faculty researchers. The center was established in 1994 to facilitate research directives of the college. It also has its research laboratories on the fourth floor of Gokongwei Hall. The following are the activities done by the center:
Symposium on Semantic Web and Ontology
2nd Natural Language Processing Research Symposium
Constraint-based Action Planning
De La Salle University Science and Technology Congress 2005
DOST Research Proposal Preparation
Machine Translation Project

Center for Complexity and Emerging Technologies (COMET)
The Center for Complexity and Emerging Technologies (COMET) is a multidisciplinary research and professional laboratory at the College of Computer Studies that investigate the science of complex adaptive systems and explores innovative ways of interacting with computing solutions. Aside from performing research, the center also functions as a development laboratory for the creation of various civic computing solutions, integrating research done internally.

COMET is currently composed of lead researchers, cohorts, and research assistants. The lead researchers come from the fields of computing, statistics, mathematics, and physics. The cohorts and research assistants are students from the different programs and specializations under the College of Computer Studies. The research lab also leverages its research in complex adaptive systems and computer-human interaction with the development of civic computing solutions. 

The lab has three divisions, namely: Complex Systems, Seamless Interactions (Human-Computer Interaction), and Civic Services.

Consulting and Education Center
Consulting and Education Center is a continuing non-degree computer training center of the college currently headed by Engr. Jesus Gonzalez. The center provides quality education for both professionals and students. Included in its services are corporate training, tutorials, and summer classes catering to children, secondary students, and professionals. As an academic center of the college, it also holds seminars and major conferences such as the Emerging Technologies for Philippines 2020 (ETFP) held last April 17–18, 2006 at the New World Renaissance Hotel.

Cisco Academy Training Center 
The college is the Cisco Academy Training Center for Expanded Courses (Sponsored Curriculum) or CATC-SC of the country. The center is responsible for conducting training on sponsored curriculum courses such as Fundamentals of Unix, Fundamentals of Java, IT Essentials, and Voice and Data Cabling. Under DLSU, training for sponsored curriculum courses is categorized into two: instructor and professional training.

Center for Empathic Human-Computer Interactions (CEHCI)
The Center for Empathic Human-Computer Interactions laboratory investigates the problem of multimodal emotion modeling and empathic response modeling to build human-centered design systems. By multimodal, we mean we recognize a human’s emotion based on facial expressions, speech, and movement (such as posture and gait). Because we extend a computing system from software to a physical space, novel approaches to providing empathic responses are required.  To achieve this, we use emotion-based interactions together with sensor-rich, ubiquitous computing and ambient intelligence.

Currently, we are focused on the development of a self-improving, ambient intelligent empathic space. It is a three-year project funded by the Philippine Government's Department of Science and Technology - Philippine Council for Advanced Science and Technology Research and Development. It is in its first year with an initial grant of PHP 3,300,000.

Student organizations
Computer Studies Government (formerly Computer Studies Assembly)
Batch Assemblies, or Computer Batches (CATCH)
Peer Tutors Society (PTS)
Society of Proactive Role Models Inspiring Total Development (SPRINT)
Student Research and Development Program (SRDP)
DLSU Game Development Laboratory (DGDL)
CCS Programmers' League (CPL)  formerly known as the InterCollegiate Programming Contest Training Pool (ICPC TraP).
MooMedia - a brainchild organization of the Instructional Systems Technology program of the college, but was later accredited as a Special Interest university-wide organization by the Council of Student Organizations of DLSU.
La Salle Computer Society (LSCS)  the only professional organization in the College of Computer Studies accredited by the Council of Student Organizations of DLSU.

Academic departments

Computer Technology
Computer Technology emphasizes the fundamental concepts of electronics, the theory and use of analog and digital components, the analysis and design of combinational and sequential digital circuits, and the techniques required to interface a microprocessor to memories, input-output ports, and other devices or other microprocessors.

Information Technology
Information Technology focuses on the study, design, implementation, and evaluation of information systems for organizations. This program aims to make the student capable of recognizing problems that are amenable to computer solutions. It also covers the study of management and organizations to bridge the gap between specialists and decision-makers in the preparation of support systems development.

Software Technology
Software Technology features courses designed to provide students with a deeper understanding of the design and analysis of computer algorithms, thus strengthening their ability to write correct and efficient programs. It integrates software engineering into major courses in a way that students can apply and discover different methodologies appropriate for different software projects.

Degree offerings

Undergraduate Degree Programs
BS in Computer Science
Major in Computer Systems Engineering (tracks: Robotics and Automation, Digital Signal Processing, Computer Architecture)
Specialization in Network Engineering (research areas: Network Security, Network Management, Converged Networks)
Specialization in Software Technology (research areas: Natural Language Processing, Game Development, Artificial Intelligence)
BS in Information Systems
Information Management Track
Organizational Development and Information Technology
Supply Chain Management
Enterprise Resource Planning
Financial Management Systems
e-Commerce and Mobile computing
Systems Quality, Testing and Assurance
Interactive Technologies Track
Digital Media Design and Construction
Interactive Multimedia Applications Development
Cognition and Technology
Game Development
Mobile and Wireless computing
BS in Information Technology

Graduate Degree Programs
Doctor of Philosophy in Computer Science
Doctor in Information Technology
Master of Science in Information Technology
Master of Science in Computer Science

Diploma Program
Post-Graduate Diploma in Computer Science

See also
De La Salle University
De La Salle Professional Schools

References
College of Computer Studies
PAASCU awards CS program Level III status

College of Computer Studies
 Information technology education